The Men's slalom competition at the 2015 World Championships was held on Sunday,  February 15. It was the final event of the championships.

A qualification was held a day earlier.

Results
The first run was started at 10:15 and the second run at 14:30.

References

Men's slalom